Cui Danfeng (born 10 January 1977) is a retired Chinese sprinter who specialized in the 100 metres.

Her personal best time is 11.20 seconds, achieved in October 1997 in Shanghai.

Achievements

References

1977 births
Living people
Chinese female sprinters
20th-century Chinese women